The Snoqualmie Tunnel is a former railroad tunnel near Snoqualmie Pass in the U.S. state of Washington, located east of Seattle. Its east portal is at Hyak.

The tunnel was originally constructed for the Chicago, Milwaukee, St. Paul and Pacific Railroad in the early 1910s and was abandoned in 1980. It now serves as part of a rail trail in Iron Horse State Park, known officially as the Palouse to Cascades State Park Trail. The trail was formerly known as the John Wayne Pioneer Trail and commonly called the Iron Horse Trail. A major renovation to the walls, ceiling, and path were completed in July 2011 after a two-year closure.

History 
The tunnel was constructed from 1912 to 1914 by the Chicago, Milwaukee, St. Paul and Pacific Railroad ("The Milwaukee Road") as part of its line from Chicago to Seattle, completed in 1909. The tunnel is aligned east–west and electrification in 1917 eliminated smoke dissipation issues.

In 1980, the Milwaukee Road received approval from the Interstate Commerce Commission to abandon its lines west of eastern Montana. On March 15, 1980, the final Milwaukee Road train passed through the tunnel.  Later, the State of Washington acquired the right-of-way for recreational use.

Today the tunnel is part of the Iron Horse State Park rails-to-trails project. It is usually closed between November 1 through early May due to ice formations inside the tunnel. On July 5, 2011, the tunnel re-opened after 11 months of renovations. The $700,000 renovation added a  layer of concrete to the walls and ceiling, a reinforced structure, and a new and improved walking surface of crushed rock.

Gallery

See also
Cascade Tunnel − Great Northern @ Stevens Pass
Stampede Tunnel − Northern Pacific @ Stampede Pass
St. Paul Pass Tunnel − (Idaho-Montana)

References

External links 

 Washington State Parks - Iron Horse State Park Trail
 Snoqualmie History
 Study of Tunnels on Rail Trails
 Washington Trails Association - Iron Horse tunnel

Railroad tunnels in Washington (state)
Chicago, Milwaukee, St. Paul and Pacific Railroad
Transportation buildings and structures in King County, Washington
Transportation buildings and structures in Kittitas County, Washington
Tunnels completed in 1914
Pedestrian tunnels in the United States